"Love Me Now" is a song by American singer John Legend. It serves as the lead single from his fifth studio album Darkness and Light, and was released on October 7, 2016, by GOOD Music and Columbia Records. The song was produced by Blake Mills and John Ryan.

Music video
On October 6, 2016, Legend uploaded the music video for "Love Me Now" on his YouTube and Vevo account. The music video is directed by Nabil Elderkin and depicts couples from various cultures expressing their love to each other. It also features Legend with his wife Chrissy Teigen and daughter Luna Simone Stephens.

Live performances
In October 2016, Legend performed the song at The Ellen DeGeneres Show and The X Factor . He also performed the song at the American Music Awards of 2016 and the season 11 finale of The Voice with contestant Wé McDonald.

Commercial performance
"Love Me Now" debuted at number 55 on the Billboard Hot 100 chart dated October 19, 2016. Its debut was driven mostly by digital download sales, with 35,000 copies sold in its first week.

Charts

Weekly charts

Year-end charts

Certifications

Release history

References

2016 singles
2016 songs
John Legend songs
Reggae fusion songs
Columbia Records singles
GOOD Music singles